Diplomatic relations between Syria and the United States are currently non-existent; they were suspended in 2012 after the onset of the Syrian Civil War. Priority issues between the two states include the Arab–Israeli conflict, the Golan Heights annexation, and the Iraq War.

According to the 2012 U.S. Global Leadership Report, through a poll conducted during the Syrian Civil War, 29% of Syrians approve of U.S. leadership, with 40% disapproving and 31% uncertain.

Background of political relations

1835–1946
The official relations began in 1835 when the United States first appointed U.S. consuls to Aleppo which was then a part of the Ottoman Empire. After Syrian independence was declared in 1945 the United States established a consulate in Damascus. On September 7, 1946, the United States recognized an independent Syria, appointing George Wadsworth to the diplomatic mission.

1957–1990

As a result of a failed 1957 Central Intelligence Agency (CIA) coup attempt to topple Syrian President Shukri al-Quwatli, Syria asked US Ambassador James S. Moose to leave Damascus. In return Syrian Ambassador Faris Zain Al-Din was recalled to Syria. Later, U.S.–Syrian relations were severed again in 1967 after the Six-Day War (Israeli–Arab War) which resulted in Israel's occupation of the Golan Heights. Following the achievement of the Agreement on Disengagement between Israel and Syria, relations resumed in June 1974, and, afterwards, U.S. President Richard Nixon visited Damascus on an official trip.

In a 1986 interview on CNN, former US Secretary of State Alexander Haig, when asked which country he regarded as the world's worst state sponsor of terrorism, answered "unquestionably Syria."

1990–2000
During the Gulf War in 1990–91, Syria cooperated with the United States as a member of the multinational coalition of forces. The U.S. and Syria also consulted closely on the Taif Accord, ending the civil war in Lebanon.

In 1991, Syrian President Hafez al-Assad made a historic decision to accept then-President Bush's invitation to attend a Middle East peace conference and to engage in subsequent bilateral negotiations with Israel. Syria improved its relations with the United States by securing the release of Western hostages held in Lebanon and lifting the travel restrictions on Syrian Jews.

Throughout the Clinton Administration there were multiple attempts to engage al-Assad in Middle East peace negotiations. These include several presidential summits including a visit by President Bill Clinton to Syria in 1994; the last one occurred when then-President Bill Clinton met the President Hafez al-Assad in Geneva in March 2000.

2001–2008
In the aftermath of the September 11 attacks in the United States in 2001, the Syrian Government began limited cooperation with U.S. in the War on Terror. In one such case, Syrian intelligence alerted the U.S. of an al-Qaeda plan similar to the USS Cole bombing, which was to fly a hang glider loaded with explosives into the U.S. Navy's Fifth Fleet headquarters in Bahrain.

Syria's opposition to the Iraq War deteriorated relations. Serious contention arose because the Syrian Government failed to prevent foreign fighters from using Syrian borders to enter Iraq and refused to deport the elements from the former Saddam Hussein government that support Iraqi insurgency. In turn, Syrian officials had concerns due to the high influx of Iraqi refugees into their country. In May 2003, the U.S. Secretary of State, Colin Powell, visited Damascus to demand Syrian closure of the offices of Hamas, Islamic Jihad and the Popular Front for the Liberation of Palestine.

Issues of U.S. concern include its ongoing interference in Lebanese affairs, its protection of the leadership of Palestinian rejectionist groups in Damascus, its human rights record, and its pursuit of weapons of mass destruction. Relations diminished after the assassination of former Lebanese Prime Minister Rafik Hariri. In February 2005, in the wake of the Hariri assassination, the U.S. recalled its Ambassador to Washington.

In 2008, the CIA and the U.S. Joint Special Operations Command (JSOC) carried out a paramilitary raid targeting al-Qaeda in Iraq in the town of Sukkariyeh in Abu Kamal. Subsequent reports revealed that nearly a dozen similar operations had taken place in Syria, Pakistan, and elsewhere since a 2004 classified executive order, the Al Qaeda Network Exord, permitted such missions, stipulating that those in sensitive countries such as Syria and Pakistan required presidential approval.

Accusations of terrorism
Syria is considered to be a secular dictatorship with a poor human rights record. Syria has been on the U.S. list of state sponsors of terrorism since the list's inception in 1979 and deems it to be a “safe-haven” for terrorists. Syria rejects its classification by the U.S. as a state sponsor of terrorism. However, in a 1986 interview on CNN, former US Secretary of State Alexander Haig, when asked which country he regarded as the world's worst state sponsor of terrorism, answered "unquestionably Syria." Also in 1986, the U.S. withdrew its ambassador and imposed additional administrative sanctions on Syria in response to evidence of direct Syrian involvement in an attempt to blow up an Israeli airplane. A U.S. ambassador returned to Damascus in 1987, partially in response to positive Syrian actions against terrorism such as expelling the Abu Nidal Organization from Syria and helping free an American hostage earlier that year.

Syria has publicly condemned international terrorist attacks, and has not been directly linked to terrorist activity since 1986, as it denies any involvement in Hariri killing. Syria actively bars any Syrian-based terrorist attacks and targeting of Westerners. Instead, Syria provides “passive support” to groups it deems as legitimate resistance movements. The United States characterizes this as providing safe-havens for terrorists groups, as the Syrian government allows groups such as Hamas, Palestinian Islamic Jihad, and the Popular Front for the Liberation of Palestine-General Command to operate within its borders. The U.S. believes that Syria provides tactical and political support to these groups and in April 2010 condemned Syria as it believes it provides SCUD missiles to Hezbollah forces in Lebanon.

On September 4, 2013, the Syrian Parliament addressed a letter to the U.S. House of Representatives. This letter argued against a U.S. bombing campaign against Syria, appealing to the two governments' common fight against Islamic extremism and blaming recent chemical weapons attacks on insurgents.

Iraqi foreign fighters
The U.S. has also blamed Syria for the movement of foreign al-Qaeda affiliates into Iraq. The movement of these foreign fighters peaked between 2005 and 2007; however, Syria attempted to decrease such movement through increased monitoring of borders, and improved screening practices of those crossing the border. Since 2009 the Syrian government has indicated willingness to increase border security cooperation between Iraqi and US forces.

2006 US embassy bombing attempt in Damascus
On September 12, 2006 the U.S. Embassy was attacked by four armed assailants with guns, grenades and a car bomb (which failed to detonate). Syrian Security Forces successfully countered the attack, killing three attackers and injuring one. Two other Syrians killed during the attack were a government security guard and a passerby. The Syrian Government publicly stated that terrorists had carried out the attack. The U.S. Government has not received an official Syrian Government assessment of the motives or organization behind the attack, but security was upgraded at U.S. facilities. The Syrian ambassador to the U.S., Imad Moustapha, blamed the attack on Jund al-Sham; meanwhile, President Bashar al-Assad, however, blamed U.S. foreign policy in the region as contributing to the incident.

Economic sanctions
The U.S. government has imposed a series of economic sanctions on Syria. The chief form of sanctioning results in Syria's inclusion on the list of state sponsors of terrorism. These include legislatively mandated penalties, including export sanctions and ineligibility to receive most forms of U.S. aid or to purchase U.S. military equipment.

Executive orders
There have been a series of executive orders enacted by President George W. Bush which include Executive Orders 13315, 13224, 13382, 13338, 13399, 13441, and 13460. These sanctions are imposed on certain Syrian citizens or entities due to their participation in terrorism, acts of public corruption, or their destabilizing activities in Iraq and Lebanon. In May 2004, a new comprehensive set of economic sanctions were enacted under the Bush administration by Executive Order 13338.  In May 2010 President Barack Obama renewed this set of sanctions against Syria. As of 2010, there have been 20 Syrian citizens who have been sanctioned.

On August 18, 2011, Executive Order 13582 signed by President Obama froze all assets of the Government of Syria, prohibited U.S. persons from engaging in any transaction involving the Government of Syria, banned U.S. imports of Syrian-origin petroleum or petroleum products, prohibited U.S. persons from having any dealings in or related to Syria's petroleum or petroleum products, and prohibited U.S. persons from operating or investing in Syria. This is considered the start of the comprehensive U.S. embargo on Syria.

Commercial Bank of Syria
In 2006, the U.S. government enacted sanctions against the Commercial Bank of Syria which was a result of money laundering concerns provided for under section 311 of the USA PATRIOT Act. These sanctions stop U.S. banks and subsidiaries from maintaining correspondence accounts with the Commercial Bank of Syria.

Syrian Accountability and Lebanese Sovereignty Restoration Act
The Syria Accountability and Lebanese Sovereignty Restoration Act, imposed sanctions on Syria banned the majority of exports to Syria except food and medicine, specifically prohibiting the export of most goods containing more than 10% U.S.-manufactured component parts to Syria.

Since 2009

Under President Barack Obama
The Obama administration initiated a policy of rapprochement with Syria. However, with the governments' violent response to the Syrian civil war in 2011, relations cooled dramatically and senior American officials, including President Obama himself, repeatedly called for Syrian President Bashar al-Assad to resign.

Lifting of travel restrictions
In February 2010 the US travel advisory for American citizens traveling to Syria was lifted. The advisory had been in place since the 2006 embassy bombing attempt. The US Embassy in Syria reported that, "After carefully assessing the current situation in Syria, we determined that circumstances didn't merit extending the travel warning.” This move was seen by many as one of the first steps towards better bilateral relations.

Re-engagement
On February 17, 2010, U.S. President Barack Obama appointed American diplomat Robert Stephen Ford to serve as the new U.S. Ambassador to Syria, the first since 2005 in the aftermath of the Hariri assassination. Shortly after Ford's appointment, Under Secretary of State for Political Affairs William J. Burns arrived in Damascus and hosted talks with President Bashar al-Assad in an attempt to revive relations. The talks were described as "candid" and that common ground was met on those issues pertaining to Iraq and Lebanon. In July 2010, Senator Arlen Specter met with al-Assad in attempts to further continue the new dialogue. In meetings revolved around discussing "specific steps to promote regional stability, revive Syria–Israel peace talks, and strengthen U.S.–Syrian bilateral relations."

Diplomatic cables between the US embassy in Damascus and the State Department that were released by WikiLeaks in 2011 revealed that the US gave financial support to political opposition groups and related projects at least through September 2010. The cables were sent because embassy staff became worried as Syrian intelligence agents were investigating these programs. The financing which began during the presidency of George W. Bush included $6 million to the Barada satellite television channel which broadcast anti-government programming into Syria. Barada TV is closely affiliated with the Movement for Justice and Development, a London-based network of Syrian exiles.

Reaction to Syrian Civil War

As the conflict in Syria had intensified, U.S. president Obama in mid-August 2011 stated publicly that Syria's president Bashar al-Assad should step down. The U.S. pushed strongly for the United Nations Security Council to pass a resolution condemning the Syrian government's measures to suppress the rebellion and adopting economic sanctions against Syria in late September and early October 2011, and when Russia and the People's Republic of China wielded their veto power to block the proposal, Ambassador Susan Rice expressed "outrage".

Relations were further strained by Syrian security forces' failure to protect Robert Stephen Ford, the U.S. ambassador to Syria, from being attacked by pro-Assad crowds on at least two occasions, as well as to prevent vandalism of the U.S. embassy and diplomatic property.  On October 24, 2011, the U.S. announced that it had recalled Ambassador Ford due to 'credible threats against his personal safety."

After the revelation of the Houla massacre in May 2012, the U.S. State Department announced that Syrian chargé d'affaires in Washington had been given 72 hours to leave the country.

Effective February 6, 2012, the U.S. Embassy suspended operations and closed for normal consular services. Currently, US interests in Syria are represented by an Interests Section in the Embassy of the Czech Republic.

In December 2012, US president Barack Obama announced the US would formally recognise the Syrian Opposition Coalition, rather than the Damascus government, as the legitimate representative of the Syrian people. , the embassy of the United States is suspended due to the Syrian Civil War. The Syrian National Coalition’s offices in the United States were recognised as diplomatic missions in May 2014.

Arming Syrian rebels

Between 2013 and 2017, under the aegis of the covert CIA-directed operation Timber Sycamore and the overt Department of Defence-led Syrian Train and Equip Program, the US trained and armed nearly 10,000 rebel fighters at a cost of $1 billion a year. The CIA had been sending weapons to anti-government rebels in Syria since at least 2012. Some of these weapons reportedly fell into hands of extremists, such as al-Nusra Front and ISIL. Former CIA analyst and Brookings Institution fellow Bruce Riedel has stated that Saudi support for the program has given Saudi Arabia greater say over American policy in the Syrian Civil War.

It was reported in July 2017 that President Donald Trump had ordered a "phasing out" of the CIA's support for anti-government rebels. It was reportedly done in order to improve relations with Russia. It was said it would be done not without a return. In December 2017, Max Abrams and John Glaser observed in the Los Angeles Times that "[ISIL] imploded right after external support for the 'moderate' rebels dried up," which is consistent with studies demonstrating that "external support for the opposition tends to exacerbate and extend civil wars, which usually peter out not through power-sharing agreements among fighting equals, but when one side—typically, the incumbent—achieves dominance."

Under President Donald Trump

Trump's safe zone proposals
During and after his campaign, Trump proposed establishing safe zones in Syria as an alternative to Syrian refugees' immigration to the US. In the past "safe zones" have been interpreted as establishing, among other things, no-fly zones over Syria. During the Obama administration Turkey encouraged the US to establish safe zones; the Obama administration was concerned about the potential for pulling the US into a war with Russia. Although safe zones were not in the final version of Trump's controversial Executive Order 13769, an earlier draft leaked several days before would have required the US to create a plan for safe zones in Syria.

On January 30, 2017, the Saudi government informed Trump that it supported the creation of safe zones in Syria and Yemen. Two days later, on February 2, 2017, Trump discussed safe zones with the government of Jordan. On February 3 the U.S. secured Lebanon's backing for safe zones in Syria. On February 1, 2017, Russia asked the U.S. to be more specific on its safe-zone plan and expressed hope the U.S. would discuss it with Russia before implementation. On February 3, 2017, the United Nations High Commissioner on Refugees opposed safe zones. On February 10, 2017, Syrian President Bashar al-Assad, while welcoming a notion that U.S. troops might fight alongside Syria, rejected the proposal for safe zones as "not a realistic idea at all". Turkey unveiled a new proposal for safe zones to Sunni Arab states in a meeting in Bahrain on February 13, 2017.

On December 19, 2018, President Trump announced that he ordered the pullout of all 2,000-2,500 U.S. troops operating in Syria, though no clear timetable was given. U.S. operations in al-Tanf continued into 2019.

Policy on Bashar al-Assad
On March 29, 2017, during the Presidency of Donald Trump the United States Secretary of State Rex Tillerson expressed that the longer term status of president Bashar al-Assad is to be "decided by the Syrian people". This appears as a policy shift, since under president Barack Obama’s administration, the US made the departure of Assad a key policy aim. On March 30, 2017, United States Ambassador to the United Nations Nikki Haley reaffirmed that the priority of the United States policy concerning Bashar al-Assad is to no longer force him out of power.

On April 7, 2017, US missiles destroyed Shayrat Air Base in Homs Governorate which US military claimed to be the base for the aircraft that carried out the Khan Shaykhun chemical attack three days earlier.

In April 2018, the US, alongside France and the UK, carried out missile strikes against Assad's compounds in response to the Douma chemical attack.

On June 17, 2020, reports claimed that the US imposed tough new economic sanctions under the Caesar Act, targeting anyone doing business with the Syrian President Bashar al-Assad from anywhere in the world. The sanctions were imposed to compel the Syrian government to halt its human rights abuses on civilians and accept a peaceful political transition. For the first time, the US has targeted Bashar al-Assad's wife, Asma al-Assad, claiming that she is "one of Syria's most notorious war profiteers".

On November 9, 2020, more sanctions were imposed on entities and individuals including parliament members who were supporting the al-Assad regime during the civil war.

Under President Joe Biden

See also
 Syrian American
 American-led intervention in the Syrian Civil War
 Foreign involvement in the Syrian Civil War § United States
 Syrian Train and Equip Program
 Caesar Syria Civilian Protection Act
 Timber Sycamore

References

Further reading
 Sami Moubayed. Syria and the USA: Washington's Relations With Damascus From Wilson to Eisenhower  (I.B. Tauris, distributed by Palgrave Macmillan; 2012) 207
 O'Sullivan, Christopher D. FDR and the End of Empire: The Origins of American Power in the Middle East (Palgrave Macmillan, 2012)
 Andrew James Bowen, Syrian-American Relations 1973-1977 (PhD diss., 2013)
 Jasmine K. Gani: Understanding and explaining US-Syrian relations: conflict and cooperation, and the role of ideology (PhD diss., 2011)

External links

 History of Syria - U.S. relations
U.S. Involvement with Syria from the Dean Peter Krogh Foreign Affairs Digital Archives
 Embassy of Syria - Washington, DC
 Embassy of U.S.A. - Damascus

 
United States
Bilateral relations of the United States